William Brantley Harvey, Sr. (June 5, 1893 – March 20, 1981) was an American lawyer and politician.

Harvey was the brother of Etta Causey Harvey. She was married to Randolph Murdaugh Sr. (1887-1940) and was mother to Randolph "Buster" Murdaugh Jr. (1915-1998) and great-grandmother to Alex Murdaugh. ==Biography==
Harvey was born in Hampton, South Carolina. Harvey served as a medical corpsman in the United States Navy during World War I. In 1923, he received his bachelor's and law degrees from University of South Carolina. Harvey practiced law in Beaufort, South Carolina. Brantley served in the South Carolina House of Representatives from 1924 to 1928 and in the South Carolina Senate from 1928 to 1952. Harvey died in Beaufort, South Carolina. His son was W. Brantley Harvey Jr., who also served in the South Carolina General Assembly.

Notes

1893 births
1981 deaths
People from Beaufort, South Carolina
People from Hampton County, South Carolina
Military personnel from South Carolina
University of South Carolina alumni
South Carolina lawyers
Members of the South Carolina House of Representatives
South Carolina state senators
20th-century American politicians
20th-century American lawyers